Marko Bulat (born 26 September 2001) is a Croatian professional footballer currently playing as a midfielder for Prva HNL club Dinamo Zagreb.

Personal life
He is the son of Josip and the nephew of Ivan Bulat, both retired footballers.

Career statistics

Club

Notes

Honours
Šibenik
 Druga HNL: 2019–20

References

External links

2001 births
Living people
Sportspeople from Šibenik
Association football forwards
Croatian footballers
Croatia youth international footballers
HNK Šibenik players
GNK Dinamo Zagreb players
First Football League (Croatia) players
Croatian Football League players